John Gray (January 5, 1837 – February 14, 1917) was an Ontario horticulturalist and political figure. He represented York West in the Legislative Assembly of Ontario as a Conservative member from 1883 to 1886.

He was born in York County, Ontario in 1837, the son of John Gray, an Irish immigrant. He married Catherine Calverley in 1861. Gray served as a major in the militia, commanding the Toronto Field Battery. He was reeve for Parkdale from 1879 to 1881 and was also a member of the local Masonic lodge.

He died February 14, 1917.

References

External links 
The Canadian parliamentary companion, 1885 JA Gemmill

History of Toronto and County of York, Ontario ..., GM Adam (1885)

1837 births
1917 deaths
Progressive Conservative Party of Ontario MPPs